The 2009 Louisiana–Monroe Warhawks football team represented University of Louisiana at Monroe as a member of the Sun Belt Conference during the 2009 NCAA Division I FBS football season. Led by Charlie Weatherbie in his seventh and final season as head coach, the Warhawks compiled an overall record of 6–6 with a mark of 5–3 in conference play, tying for third place in the Sun Belt. Louisiana–Monroe was bowl eligible, but was not invited to a bowl game. The team played home games at Malone Stadium in Monroe, Louisiana.

Weatherbie was fired at the end of the season. He compiled an overall recod of 31–51 in seven seasons as head coach for the Warhawks.

Schedule

References

Louisiana–Monroe
Louisiana–Monroe Warhawks football seasons
Louisiana–Monroe Warhawks football